Jessica Monroe (born May 31, 1966) is a Canadian rower. She was born in Palo Alto, California. Monroe won two gold medals at the 1992 Summer Olympics in Barcelona, in coxless four and in coxed eight, and a silver medal in 1996 in Atlanta.

Awards and honours
In 2013, Monroe was inducted into the Canada's Sports Hall of Fame.

References

External links

1966 births
Living people
Canadian female rowers
Olympic rowers of Canada
Olympic gold medalists for Canada
Olympic silver medalists for Canada
Rowers at the 1992 Summer Olympics
Rowers at the 1996 Summer Olympics
Olympic medalists in rowing
Medalists at the 1996 Summer Olympics
Medalists at the 1992 Summer Olympics
20th-century Canadian women